The women's 10 kilometre freestyle pursuit cross-country skiing competition at the 1994 Winter Olympics in Lillehammer, Norway, was held on 17 February at Birkebeineren Ski Stadium in Lillehammer. The Italian Stefania Belmondo was the 1993 World champion and Russian Lyubov Yegorova (then representing the Unified Team) was the defending champion from the 1992 Olympics in Albertville, France. 

Each skier started based on the results from the 5 km classical event, skiing the entire 10 kilometre course after the first-to-finish principle. Lyubov Yegorova of Russia started first in the race with a gap of 19.5 seconds to Manuela Di Centa of Italy. Yegorova held on to her lead and won over Di Centa with 7.8 seconds; her second consecutive olympic gold medal in the pursuit event.

Results
The time consists the added times for both the 5 km classical and the 10 km freestyle pursuit.

References

External links
 Final results (International Ski Federation)

Women's cross-country skiing at the 1994 Winter Olympics
Women's pursuit cross-country skiing at the Winter Olympics